Siri Lindley (born May 26, 1969) is an American triathlon coach and former professional triathlete. She is the 2001 ITU Triathlon World Champion as well as the winner of the 2001 and 2002 ITU Triathlon World Cup series and 2001 ITU Aquathlon World Championships. She has coached a number of Olympic and Ironman athletes and champions, including Mirinda Carfrae, Leanda Cave, Sarah True, and Susan Williams. In 2014, she was selected to be a member of the inaugural International Triathlon Union (ITU) Hall of Fame class.

In addition to coaching Lindley works as a public speaker and author. She has also worked as a television sports analyst covering triathlon and field hockey events for NBC during the 2004 Summer Olympics. She has reported on NCAA Field Hockey, the NCAA Final Four, and the Big 10 Tournament for NBC, CSTV, and TVNZ.

Career

Triathlon
Lindley grew up in Greenwich, Connecticut, as an athletic and shy child. She attended Greenwich High School, where she played field hockey, ice hockey, and lacrosse. She later attended Brown University, where she played at the varsity level in the same three sports and graduated with a degree in psychology. Following graduation, she spent two years coaching field hockey and lacrosse – one year at Princeton University and one year at Lehigh University.

In 1992 Lindley competed in her first triathlon without having much prior knowledge or training in swimming. She trained while working 60-hour weeks at a local YMCA in Worcester, Massachusetts.

In 1996 she began competing in ITU World Cup races and was consistently producing top-10 finishes in 1999 under coach Jack Ralston. By 2000 she was focusing on qualifying for the 2000 Summer Olympics, the year the triathlon was making its first appearance in the Olympic program. At the U.S. Olympic Trials in Dallas, Lindley failed to take one of the top two spots in the race to qualify, but instead took third and accompanied the team to Sydney as an alternate. Thereafter, she made some changes in her training, including joining coach Brett Sutton's squad at the suggestion of Loretta Harrop. Soon after joining his squad, Sutton had her race in the 2000 ITU Duathlon World Championships, where she took second place.

In 2001, she won six consecutive ITU World Cup races and captured the ITU World Championship title, accumulating enough points to be ranked as the top female ITU triathlete in the world. The next year, in 2002, she maintained her No. 1 ranking while repeating as the winner of the World Cup series. After that year, she decided to retire from triathlon competition to pursue what she considered her true career calling as a coach. She credits much of her success in 2001 and 2002, when she won 11 World Cup races, as well as her success as a coach, to Sutton.

Post-racing
Among her accomplishments as a coach is coaching Susan Williams to an Olympic Bronze medal at the 2004 Olympics, and Mirinda Carfrae to three Ironman World Championships. and one 70.3 World Championship 2007. In 2012, Lindley also coached Leanda Cave to an Ironman World Championship and a 70.3 World Championship in the same year. 

Lindley is the author of Surfacing: From the Depths of Self-Doubt to Winning Big and Living Fearlessly. Additionally, she is a speaker with Keppler Speakers as well as being involved in speaking engagements with Tony Robbins. She is the co-founder of Believe Ranch and Rescue, a non-profit focused on rescuing horses from slaughter. For this work Denver7 awarded Lindley and her spouse Keat the 7Everyday Heroes Award for their work saving horses from slaughter and caring for them or finding them homes.

Personal
Lindley is married to former professional triathlete Rebekah Keat. In November 2019 she was diagnosed with acute myeloid leukemia and participated in a clinical trial at the University of Colorado Anschutz Medical Campus. The following year she was declared cancer-free after receiving results from her latest bone marrow biopsy.

ITU results

Awards
2018 Boulder Colorado Sports Hall of Fame
2016 USA Triathlon Hall of Fame
2014 International Triathlon Union Hall of Fame
2007 Brown Athletic Hall of Fame
2001 Female Duathlete of the Year
2001 Triathlon Magazine's Triathlete of the Year

References

External links

1969 births
Living people
American female triathletes
Brown Bears women's ice hockey players
American LGBT sportspeople
Sportspeople from Greenwich, Connecticut
Triathlon coaches
Brown Bears field hockey players
Brown Bears women's lacrosse players
Lesbian sportswomen
LGBT field hockey players
LGBT ice hockey players
LGBT lacrosse players
LGBT triathletes
Greenwich High School alumni